Beijing Women's Prison is a prison in Daxing District, Beijing, China. It was established in 1999. 	

It is operated by the Beijing Municipal Administration of Prisons.

Home to nearly 1,000 female prisoners in Beijing and is Beijing's only prison for female criminals. They produce 23,564 prison uniforms per/year and also make school uniforms, knits, sweaters, toys, etc.

See also
List of prisons in Beijing municipality

References

女子监狱 - Beijing Municipal Administration of Prisons 
Laogai Research Foundation Handbook

Prisons in Beijing
1999 establishments in China
Women's prisons in China
Buildings and structures in Daxing District
Women in Beijing